Club Deportivo Oroquieta Villaverde is a Spanish women's football club from Madrid settled in the city's Villaverde district.

History
In 1989 Oroquieta Villaverde joined the second edition of the División de Honor. The team soon rose into the top positions and after winning its first National Cup in 1992. The club was further strengthened as Atlético Madrid disbanded its team, champion of the 1989–90 edition, and its best players joined its former rivals. Oroquieta won the national championship in 1993 and 1994, its second cup in 1995 and both titles in 1999.

However Oroquieta collapsed following this last success. In 2001 it was third to last in its group in the championship's preliminary stage, and next year it was left aside from the Royal Spanish Football Federation's reunified 12-teams Superliga. The team lost all 26 games in the new second tier and was relegated to the lower categories.

After the 2012–13 season, the club ceased in activity but in April 2015, Oroquieta Villaverde launched a new project for the neighbourhood.

Season by season

Titles
 División de Honor
 1993, 1994, 1999
 Copa de la Reina
 1992, 1995, 1999

Former internationals
  Isabel Candel
  Begoña Casalengua
  Begoña Jáuregui
  Mar Prieto

References

External links
Oroquieta Villaverde Twitter account

Women's football clubs in Spain
Football clubs in Madrid